The 1956 Los Angeles Angels season was the 54th season in the history of the Los Angeles Angels baseball team. The 1954 team won the Pacific Coast League (PCL) pennant with a 107–61 record. Bob Scheffing was the team's manager. The team played its home games at Wrigley Field in Los Angeles. 

In 1993, sports writer John Schulian wrote a feature story in Sports Illustrated about the 1956 Angeles, opining that no minor league club ever played the game better. Gene Mauch, who played second base for the team and later managed in the majors, was interviewed by Schulian and recalled: "I might be prejudiced, but I think it was the best minor league team ever put together. I saw some teams in the big leagues that couldn't play as well. Hell, I managed two of them." 

First baseman Steve Bilko received the Pacific Coast League Most Valuable Player Award and was also named Minor League Baseball's player of the year. He also won the PCL Triple Crown with a .360 batting average, 55 home runs, and 164 RBIs. 

In addition to Bilko, five other Angels hit 20 or more home runs. Gene Mauch hit .348 with 20 home runs. In his book on the 1956 Angels, Gaylon H. White wrote: "Mauch's greates value was as a leader. He was a master at devising trick plays, stealing opponents' signs and, if necessary, getting in the face of a teammate."

While Dave Hillman won 20 games for the Angels, pitching was the team's weakness. In his history of the Angels, Richard Beverage wrote: "The pitching staff was subpar and, as a result, th4 1956 Angels were probably a level below the greatest teams of PCL history."

Angels players took eight of 14 spots the PCL All-Star team selected by sports writers in November 1956. The honorees were Steve Bilko at first base, Mauch at second base, Casey Wise at shortstop, Jim Bolger and Bob Speake in the outfield, El Tappe at catcher, Dave Hillman as a pitcher, and Piper Davis as the utility infielder.

Statistics

Batting 
Note: Pos = Position; G = Games played; AB = At bats; H = Hits; Avg. = Batting average; HR = Home runs; RBI = Runs batted in

Pitching 
Note: G = Games pitched; IP = Innings pitched; W = Wins; L = Losses; PCT = Win percentage; ERA = Earned run average; SO = Strikeouts

References

Further reading
 
 "The Los Angeles Angels of the Pacific Coast League: A History, 1903-1957", Richard Beverage (McFarland 2011)
 "The Greatest Minor League: A History of the Pacific Coast League, 1903-1957", by Dennis Snelling (McFarland 2011)

1956 in sports in California
Pacific Coast League seasons